Arthur Eaton (1857 - 29 June 1924) was an architect based in Derby.

Background
He was born in Sutton on the Hill, Derbyshire, the son of Charles Eaton (1819-1893) farmer of Etwall and Jane Morley (1822-1886). He was baptised on 30 December 1857 in St Michael's Church, Sutton-on-the-Hill. He was educated at Repton School. He married Mary Elizabeth Morley (1858-1927) on 11 September 1886. They had three children:
Kathleen Eaton (1888-1962)
George Morley Eaton (1889-1940)
Doris Eaton (1891-1982) 

In retirement he lived at The Summit, Burton Road in Derby and he died on 29 June 1924.

Career
He was articled to Giles and Brookhouse in Derby before establishing his own practice at 6 St James’ Street, Derby around 1884.  He formed a partnership with his son, Captain George Morley Eaton and operated as Arthur Eaton and Son.

Works by Arthur Eaton
Board Schools, Shobnall Road, Burton upon Trent 1888
The Crest, 219 Burton Road, Derby 1896
County Court, 18-22 St Peter’s Churchyard, Derby 1897
New Dairy, Station Road, Castle Donington, 1897-98
Deaf and Dumb Institute, Friar Gate, Derby 1900 (extension)
Repton Isolation Hospital, Sandypits Lane, Etwall 1902-03
Masonic Hall, Gower Street, Derby 1902 (alterations)
Electric Power Station, Silk Mill Lane, Derby 1908
Electric Theatre, Babington Lane, Derby 1910
Carnegie Public Library, Alvaston, Derby 1914-16
Nottingham Road Council Schools, Derby
St Joseph’s Schools, Derby
Kegworth housing scheme

Works by Arthur Eaton and Son

These works were completed after the death of Arthur Eaton. The probable architect for them is his son, George Morley Eaton.
Three maisonette blocks, Penn Avenue, Lenton, Nottingham 1924-26
Village Hall, Newton Solney 1932
First Church of Christ Scientist, 3 Friary Street, Derby 1934-38
Commercial Block at the Rolls-Royce Main Works Site, Marble Hall, Nightingale Road, Derby. 1938 (alterations)
St Edmund’s Church, Sinfin Avenue, Shelton Lock, Derby 1939
Culland Hall, Brailsford, Derbyshire 1939

References

1857 births
1924 deaths
Architects from Derby
People educated at Repton School